Isfahan beryan is one of the traditional dishes of Isfahan, Iran, a fried meat served on a piece of bread (usually sangak) with onion and greens on the side.

It is cooked and sold in unique restaurants (beryanis), and is not usually served along with other foods; locals call it “beryun” بریون.

Jean-Baptiste Tavernier has written about this food in his own journal. Jean Chardin has written two accounts about beryani. Abbas the Great's Noorullah personal chef has too provided a recipe.

References 

Iranian cuisine
Culture in Isfahan